Hernandia jamaicensis is a species of plant in the Hernandiaceae family. It is endemic to Jamaica.

References

Hernandiaceae
Near threatened plants
Endemic flora of Jamaica
Taxonomy articles created by Polbot